The 1972 NCAA College Division baseball tournament decided the champion of baseball at the NCAA College Division level for the 1972 season. This was the fifth such tournament for the College Division, having separated from the University Division in 1957. It was also the first held in Springfield, Illinois, having spent the first four years in Springfield, Missouri.

Format
Twenty one teams were selected to participate, divided into four regions.  Two regions consisted of six teams, another had five, and the Midwest had four.  Each region completed a double-elimination round, with the winners advancing to the finals.  The finals, made up of the four regional champions, also competed in a double-elimination format.

Regionals

East Regional

Mideast Regional

Midwest Regional

West Regional

Finals

Participants

Results

Bracket

Game results

See also
 1972 NCAA University Division baseball tournament
 1972 NAIA World Series

References

 
NCAA Division II Baseball Tournament
NCAA College Division baseball tournament